Crassocephalum biafrae, also called Sierra Leone bologi or worow, is a shade tolerant perennial vine grown especially in Sierra Leone, often on trellises.  Its spinach-like leaves are often eaten steamed.

References

Leaf vegetables
biafrae